The Canon EOS M200 is a digital mirrorless interchangeable-lens camera first announced by Canon Inc. on September 25, 2019. Canon EOS M200 incorporates the proprietary image processor that allows the camera to capture still images up to 6.1 fps using the fixed focus and 4 fps burst mode. The EOS M200 can be connected to all EF, EF-S and TS-E lenses with an available adapter.

Design 
The EOS M200 is an interchangeable lens camera that uses the Canon EF-M lens mount.  The EOS M200 is an entry-level model which lacks the large rubber grip, multiple control dials, and hot shoe flash. The EOS M200 uses the same 24.2 MP APS-C sensor as the Canon EOS M100. The EOS M200 also uses the Dual Pixel CMOS autofocus system. The EOS M200 features the same DIGIC 8 image processor as the newer Canon EOS M6 Mark II.

Videos can be recoded in 4k at 25 fps, 1080p up to ~60 fps or 720p resolution up to ~120 fps.

Sales 
In its initial press release announcing the camera, Canon revealed that the camera would be sold in a kit including the EOS M200 and an EF-M 15-45mm f/3.5-6.3 IS STM zoom lens at a retail price of $549.99.

References

External links 

 EOS M200 Webpage

Canon EF-M-mount cameras
Cameras introduced in 2019